UCSJ may refer to:
 Universidad del Claustro de Sor Juana
 Union of Councils for Soviet Jews